Amphiglossa is a genus of flowering plants in the family Asteraceae, described as a genus in 1838.

 Species

References

Gnaphalieae
Asteraceae genera
Flora of Southern Africa